47 Squadron or 47th Squadron may refer to:

 No. 47 Squadron RAF, a unit of the United Kingdom Royal Air Force 
 47th Fighter Squadron, a unit of the United States Air Force 
 47th Bombardment Squadron, a unit of the United States Air Force 
 47th Liaison Squadron, a unit of the United States Air Force

See also
 47th Division (disambiguation)
 47th Brigade (disambiguation)